The  was a two-ship class of dreadnought battleships built for the Imperial Japanese Navy (IJN) in the first decade of the 20th century. Both ships bombarded German fortifications at Tsingtao during the Battle of Tsingtao in 1914, but saw no other combat in World War I.  sank in 1918 after an explosion in her ammunition magazine with the loss of over 600 officers and crewmen.  was disarmed in 1922 and converted into a target ship two years later to meet the terms of the Washington Naval Treaty and served until she was sunk in 1945 by American carrier aircraft. The ship was refloated after the war and scrapped in 1946–1947.

Background

The Kawachi class was ordered on 22 June 1907 under the 1907 Warship Supplement Program after the Russo-Japanese War as Japan's first dreadnoughts, although their construction was delayed by a severe depression. They were one of the first steps in the fulfillment of the recently adopted Eight-Eight Fleet Program that required a fleet of eight dreadnoughts and armored cruisers.

The first iteration of the design had six twin-gun turrets, with two pairs of superfiring turrets fore and aft of the superstructure and the two other turrets amidships "en echelon" to maximize end-on fire. This layout was rejected as it exceeded the informal  limit. The design was then revised with the turrets in the hexagonal layout using the same 45-caliber 12-inch guns used in the preceding battleships. In early 1908, the IJN received reports that the Royal Navy's latest battleships used longer 50-caliber guns. The Chief of the Naval General Staff, Admiral Tōgō Heihachirō, pushed to use these guns; cost considerations prevented all the guns from having the same barrel length, so they were used only in the fore and aft turrets.

Description
The two ships had different bow designs for comparison purposes; Settsus clipper bow was longer than Kawachis vertical stem. Otherwise the two ships were externally virtually identical. Their crew ranged from 999 to 1100 officers and enlisted men.

Armament
The Kawachi class carried four 50-caliber Type 41 12-inch guns mounted in two twin-gun turrets, one each fore and aft of the superstructure. Settsus guns were ordered from Vickers and Kawachis were built in Japan. The fore and aft turrets could each traverse 270°. The eight 45-caliber 12-inch 41st Year Type were mounted in four twin-gun wing turrets, two on each broadside. Each turret could traverse 160°. Each 12-inch gun was provided with 80 rounds, normally loaded at an elevation of +5°, although they could be loaded at any angle up to +13°. The guns had an elevation range of -5° to +25°.

Their secondary armament consisted of ten 45-caliber 6-inch (152 mm) guns, mounted in casemates in the sides of the hull, and eight 40-caliber quick-firing (QF) 4.7-inch (120 mm) 41st Year Type guns. Each gun was also provided with 150 rounds.

The ships were also equipped with a dozen 40-caliber QF 12-pounder 41st Year Type guns for defense against torpedo boats and four shorter 12-pounder guns were used as saluting guns or mounted on the ships' boats. They carried a total of 1,200 rounds for the longer guns and another 1,200 for the shorter guns.

In addition, they were fitted with five submerged  torpedo tubes, two on each broadside and one in the stern. Two of the ships' boats could carry torpedoes and the ships carried a total of 24 Type 43 torpedoes.

Armor
The waterline main belt of the Kawachi-class ships consisted of Krupp cemented armor that had a maximum thickness of 12 inches amidships and tapered to a thickness of  inches at the ends of the ship. Above that was a 6-inch strake that protected the casemates. The armor of all the 12-inch gun turrets had a maximum thickness of 11 inches with a 3-inch roof.

Ships

Service
Following the Japanese ship-naming conventions, Kawachi and Settsu were named after ancient Japanese provinces, both now a part of Osaka prefecture. The only significant action performed by either ship during World War I was when they bombarded German fortifications in October–November 1914 during the final stage of the Battle of Tsingtao. They were both assigned to the First Squadron until they were refitted in 1917 and 1916 respectively. Upon their completion of their refits, both ships were assigned to the Second Squadron. On 12 July 1918, Kawachi was sunk in an accidental magazine explosion in Tokuyama Bay that killed over 600 crewmen. Stricken from the Navy List on 21 September 1918, the wreck was later partially dismantled although most of the hull was abandoned in place to serve as an artificial reef.

Settsu was reassigned to the First Squadron later that month. By this time, the dozen 40-caliber 3-inch 4th Year Type guns had been removed and four 3-inch anti-aircraft guns were added. Two of the torpedo tubes were also removed. The ship served as the flagship for Emperor Taishō for the naval reviews held in 1918 and 1919. She was placed in reserve in late 1919 and reboilered during an overhaul that lasted until 1921. Settsu was disarmed in 1922 under the terms of the Washington Naval Treaty and stricken from the Navy List on 1 October 1923. Her guns were turned over to the Imperial Japanese Army for use as coastal artillery; her main gun turrets were installed around the Strait of Tsushima. The rest of her guns were placed in reserve and scrapped in 1943. The ship was converted into a target ship in 1924 with her armor reinforced to withstand hits.

In 1935–1937, the ship was converted to radio-control which allowed her to be maneuvered by operators aboard another ship and additional armor was added. At the beginning of the Second Sino-Japanese War in 1937, she transported a battalion of naval troops to the Shanghai area. Settsu simulated the radio traffic of eight aircraft carriers at the beginning of the Pacific War in an effort to deceive Allied intelligence as to the locations and activities of the Japanese carriers. For the rest of the war she served as a target for carrier pilots. Settsu was badly damaged when Allied carrier aircraft attacked the IJN base at Kure in July 1945 and was forced to beach herself lest she sink. The ship was stricken from the Navy List on 20 November and her hulk was raised and broken up in 1946–1947.

Notes

Footnotes

References
 
 
 

 (contact the editor at lars.ahlberg@halmstad.mail.postnet.se for subscription information)

External links

Battleship classes